Crónicas marcianas (Martian Chronicles) was a Spanish late-night talk show produced by  and broadcast by Telecinco from 1997 to 2005.

It is the longest running and most watched late-night talk show in the history of Spanish television.

History
Crónicas marcianas began airing on 8 September 1997 to compete with Antena 3's , which was then the ratings leader. In principle, Crónicas marcianas contributed less sensationalism and a softer form of humor, with comedians, co-presenter Martí Galindo, wild animals, videos of pratfalls, and interviews with celebrities such as Cindy Crawford, Marta Sánchez, David Copperfield, Enrique Iglesias, and Ricky Martin.

Crónicas marcianas came to surpass La sonrisa del pelícano in audience, and became the undisputed leader in its time slot after the latter was canceled amid controversy. Boris Izaguirre began appearing on the show to give "semiotic" analysis of celebrity gossip, in addition to performing "transformism" and striptease numbers.

For his part, Javier Cárdenas toured Spain to find different characters to interview. Some of these interviews were criticized for mocking their subjects, and Cárdenas and Sardà were ordered to pay €15,000 in compensation after a 2002 segment in which a court found they had committed "illegitimate meddling in the honor" of a young man with a disability. Some interviewees became popular, such as Paco Porras, Leonardo Dantés, Tamara, La Bruja Loja, Carmen de Mairena, and El Mocito Feliz, and they appeared together with Cárdenas in the feature film . The controversial singer Tamara (later known as Yurena) had a number one single with "No cambié", and the program also sponsored the release of several music compilations.

Examples include Aída Nízar, Sonia Arenas, Jorge Berrocal, Dinio García, María José Galera, Carlos "El Yoyas" Navarro, Silvia Fominaya, Marta López, Noemí Ungría, and Raquel Morillas. The discussion tables were occupied by Nuria Bermúdez, Borja Hernán, Erika Alonso, Mari Cielo Pajares (daughter of actor Andrés Pajares), Italian nobleman , Coto Matamoros, Mayte Alonso, Mila Ximénez, and other personalities. Themes such as celebrity relationships, accusations of drug abuse and trafficking, and the practice of prostitution became more prevalent. In this last period, Carlos Latre, and  joined Sardà as co-presenters.

Its cancellation was announced at the end of the season, while it was still the late-night ratings leader.

List of contributors

Ratings by season

International versions
A Portuguese version, Noites marcianas, presented by Carlos Cruz, was also broadcast on SIC in 2001.

Notes

References

External links
 

1990s television talk shows
1997 Spanish television series debuts
2000s television talk shows
2005 Spanish television series endings
Spanish television talk shows
Telecinco original programming